Maurice Tranchant de Lunel (25 November 1869, La Ferté-sous-Jouarre – 1944, La Seyne-sur-Mer), was a 20th-century French architect and writer.

Biography 
An architect of historical monuments in Morocco, Maurice Tranchant de Lunel was the designer of the Grand Mosque of Paris.

In 1912, he was appointed director of the Department of Antiquities, fine art and historic monuments of the French protectorate in Morocco by Lyautey. His mission was to preserve Moroccan monuments and establish a ranking list of historical monuments in Morocco.

From 1920 to 1923, he was inspector of fine arts, antiques, monuments and architect of the Protectorate of Morocco.

He was also a painter (watercolorist), illustrator and writer.

Selected publications 
1924: Au pays du paradoxe: Maroc (preface by Claude Farrère.)
1931: Le tour du monde en un jour à l'Exposition coloniale
1933: Je jongle avec les chiffres (Editions du Jardin des Modes)
1936: Chansons des quatre saisons 
1939: La princesse des Baux, légende radiophonique en 4 tableaux avec les anciennes chansons provençales
1939: Baba-Yaga, conte radiophonique adaptation d'un conte populaire russe
1944: L'alphabet de la famille
1945: Petits métiers pour les enfants sages qui deviendront grands
1945: Les chansons de l'herbe et de la rosée
1945: Vacances en petits morceaux
1947: Petite géographie: pour les enfants sages
1954: Un Bouquet de proverbes pour les douze mois de l'an 1954

References

Sources 
 François Pouillon, Dictionnaire des orientalistes de langue française, 2012

External links 
 Maurice Tranchant de Lunel on data.bnf.fr
  Maurice Tranchant de Lunel on Marocpluriel
 Detailed biography on Maroc-Méditerranée
 Maurice Tranchant de Lunel's watercolors

1869 births
People from La Ferté-sous-Jouarre
1944 deaths
20th-century French architects
20th-century French non-fiction writers